Tibor Radó (June 2, 1895 – December 29, 1965) was a Hungarian mathematician who moved to the  United States after World War I.

Biography
Radó was born in Budapest and between 1913 and 1915 attended the Polytechnic Institute, studying civil engineering. In World War I, he became a First Lieutenant in the Hungarian Army and was captured on the Russian Front. He escaped from a Siberian prisoner camp and, traveling thousands of miles across Arctic wasteland, managed to return to Hungary.

He received a doctorate from the Franz Joseph University in 1923. He taught briefly at the university and then became a research fellow in Germany for the Rockefeller Foundation. In 1929, he moved to the United States and lectured at Harvard University and the Rice Institute before obtaining a faculty position in the Department of Mathematics at Ohio State University in 1930. In 1935 he was granted American citizenship. In World War II he was a science consultant to the United States government, interrupting his academic career. He became Chairman of the Department of Mathematics at Ohio State University in 1948.

In the 1920s, he proved that surfaces have an essentially unique triangulation. In 1933, Radó published  "On the Problem of Plateau" in which he gave a solution to Plateau's problem, and in 1935, "Subharmonic Functions".  His work focused on computer science in the last decade of his life and in May 1962 he published one of his most famous results in the Bell System Technical Journal: the busy beaver function and its non-computability ("On Non-Computable Functions").

He died in New Smyrna Beach, Florida.

Works
 Über den Begriff der Riemannschen Fläche, Acta Scientarum Mathematicarum Universitatis Szegediensis, 1925
 The problem of least area and the problem of Plateau, Mathematische Zeitschrift Vol. 32, 1930, p.763
 On the problem of Plateau, Springer-Verlag, Berlin, Ergebnisse der Mathematik und ihrer Grenzgebiete, 1933, 1951, 1971
 Subharmonic Functions, Springer, Ergebnisse der Mathematik und ihrer Grenzgebiete, 1937
 Length and Area, AMS Colloquium Lectures, 1948
with Paul V. Reichelderfer Continuous transformations in analysis - with an introduction to algebraic topology, Springer 1955
 On Non-Computable Functions, Bell System Technical Journal 41/1962 scan
 Computer studies of Turing machine problems, Journal of the ACM 12/1965

See also
Radó's theorem (Riemann surfaces)
Radó's theorem (harmonic functions)

References

External links

Biography from the Ohio State University and other links

1895 births
1965 deaths
20th-century Hungarian mathematicians
Hungarian emigrants to the United States
20th-century American mathematicians
Franz Joseph University alumni
Harvard University staff
Rice University faculty
Ohio State University faculty
Austro-Hungarian mathematicians